Vadim Brodski (born April 24, 1950) is a Polish-Ukrainian violinist, longtime resident of Rome, Italy. A descendant of Adolf Brodsky, Vadim was born in Kiev, where he played as the soloist of Kiev Philharmonic at the age of 11. He received the first prizes at many of the international violin contests in which he participated, including the Wieniawski contest in 1977 (Poland), Paganini contest in 1984 (Italy), and Tibor Varga in 1984 (Switzerland), and fifth prize at the 1974 Tchaikovsky competition.

He is one of the few violinists playing the Guarneri del Gesù of Niccolò Paganini.

Vadim Brodski played with Moscow Philharmonic Orchestra, Saint Petersburg Philharmonic, Warsaw National Philharmonic, Mexico National Symphony, London Philharmonic, Jerusalem Symphony, New Jersey Symphony, and Suisse Romande in Geneve.

Among his recordings Violin Concerts of Tchaikovsky and Sibelius in D minor can be mentioned. He has been accompanied by the Polish Radio Symphony Orchestra in this recording.

References

External links
, biography at the site of his agent

Year of birth missing (living people)
Living people
Henryk Wieniawski Violin Competition prize-winners
Paganini Competition prize-winners
Ukrainian Jews
21st-century violinists